John Francis Small (1853 – 5 July 1923) was an Irish nationalist politician  of the Irish Parliamentary Party. He sat in the House of Commons of the United Kingdom of Great Britain and Ireland as a Member of Parliament (MP)  for County Wexford from  1883 to 1885, and for South Down from 1885 to 1886.

John Francis Small was admitted as a solicitor in 1875 and later became coroner for South Armagh, and a Poor Law Guardian. He died, in 1923, at his home in Hill Street, Newry.

References

External links 

1853 births
1923 deaths
Members of the Parliament of the United Kingdom for County Down constituencies (1801–1922)
Members of the Parliament of the United Kingdom for County Wexford constituencies (1801–1922)
Irish Parliamentary Party MPs
People from Newry
Politicians from County Armagh
UK MPs 1880–1885
UK MPs 1885–1886